Kill the Man is a 1999 American comedy film starring Luke Wilson and Joshua Malina as the owners of an independent photocopier shop who are in competition with a large chain of copy-shops.

Cast 
 Luke Wilson as Stanley Simon
 Joshua Malina as Bob Stein
 Paula Devicq as Vicki Livingston
 Phillip Rhys as Seth
 Phil LaMarr as Marky Marx
 Jim Fyfe as Guy
 Teri Garr as Mrs. Livingston
 Michael McKean as Mr. Livingston
 Lisa Robin Kelly as Nan
 Eve Plumb as Revolutionary #3	
 Brian Doyle-Murray as Grumpy Senior
 Richard Riehle as Mr. Ellias

References

External links 
 
 

1999 films
1999 comedy films
1990s English-language films
American comedy films
1990s American films